Martim Afonso de Brito (14th-century) was a Portuguese nobleman, member of the Court of Afonso IV. He was appointed Canon of the Archdiocese of Braga.

Biography 

Martim was the son of João Afonso de Brito, bishop of Lisbon, and Isabel Afonso.

References 

13th-century Portuguese people
Portuguese nobility
Portuguese Roman Catholics